HD 167665 is a yellow-white hued star with a brown dwarf companion in the southern constellation of Sagittarius. With an apparent visual magnitude of 6.39, it is near the lower brightness limit for stars that are visible to the naked eye. Based upon an annual parallax shift of 32.4 mas as seen from Earth, it is located 101 light years from the Sun. The star is moving away from the Sun with a radial velocity of +8 km/s.

It is a solar-type star with about the same mass as the Sun, but has a radius 32% greater. The star is older than the Sun with an estimated age of 6.7 billion years, and it is spinning with a projected rotational velocity of 8 km/s. HD 167665 is radiating 2.45 times the Sun's luminosity from its photosphere at an effective temperature of 6,080 K.

Based upon regular variations in radial velocity observed between 1996 and 2006, an orbiting companion was announced by the California and Carnegie Planet Search (CCPS) program in 2007. This perturbing object, designated HD 167665 b, has an orbital period of twelve years with an eccentricity of 0.342. The semimajor axis of this orbit is 5.62 AU and the object has a mass of at least . Its inclination suggests a non-zero probability that it transits its star.

References

F-type main-sequence stars
Brown dwarfs

Sagittarius (constellation)
6836
Durchmusterung objects
167665 
089620